Bangarappa ministry was the Council of Ministers in Karnataka, a state in South India headed by S. Bangarappa that was formed after Veerendra Patil submitted resignation.

In the government headed by S. Bangarappa, the Chief Minister was from INC. Apart from the CM, there were other ministers in the government.

Tenure of the Government 
In 1989, Indian National Congress emerged victorious and Veerendra Patil was elected as leader of the Party, hence sworn in as CM in 1989. A year later he submitted resignation and President's Rule was imposed and S. Bangarappa sworn in as Chief Minister later. The ministry was dissolved when S. Bangarappa submitted resignation and M. Veerappa Moily was elected as CM and S. M. Krishna was picked as Deputy Chief Minister in 1992.

Council of Ministers

Chief Minister and deputy Chief Minister

Cabinet Ministers

Minister of State 

If the office of a minister is vacant for any length of time, it automatically comes under the charge of the chief minister.

See also 

 Karnataka Legislative Assembly

References

External links 

 Council of Ministers

Cabinets established in 1990
1990 establishments in Karnataka
Bangarappa
1992 disestablishments in India
Cabinets disestablished in 1992
1990 in Indian politics
Indian National Congress state ministries